Coetie Neethling (10 July 1932 – 10 June 2015) was a South African cricketer. He played thirteen first-class matches for Western Province between 1971 and 1974.

References

External links
 

1932 births
2015 deaths
South African cricketers
Western Province cricketers
Cricketers from Cape Town